Bamanpukur Humayun Kabir Mahavidyalaya, established in 2007, is a general degree college in Bamanpukur, North 24 Parganas in the Indian state of West Bengal. It offers undergraduate courses in arts.  It is affiliated to West Bengal State University.

History

Departments

Arts

Bengali
English
Arabic
Sanskrit
History
Geography
Political Science
Philosophy
Sociology
Education
Defence Studies
Human Development

See also
Education in India
List of colleges in West Bengal
Education in West Bengal

References

External links
 

Educational institutions established in 1973
1973 establishments in West Bengal
Educational institutions established in 2007
2007 establishments in West Bengal
Colleges affiliated to West Bengal State University
Universities and colleges in North 24 Parganas district